"Ain't That Lonely Yet" is a song written by Kostas and James House, and recorded by American country music artist Dwight Yoakam.  It was released in March 1993 as the first single from his album This Time.  It peaked at number 2 for the week of  June 5, 1993 on the Billboard Hot Country Singles & Tracks.  It served as the lead-off single to his album, This Time; in addition, it went on to win a Grammy award for Best Male Country Vocal Performance.

Content
The song is a mid-tempo in which the narrator has just left his lover because of what she has put him through. She tries to win him back with phone calls and notes (left on his door).  The narrator denies his former lover, and tries to convince himself that he "ain't that lonely yet," or not lonely enough to return to her.

Critical reception
Bill Janovitz of Allmusic gave the song a positive review. He says the most compelling verse in the song is the second verse, because of the metaphor of the narrator's ex-lover as a spider.

Music video
The music video was directed by Dwight Yoakam and Carolyn Mayer.

Chart positions
"Ain't That Lonely Yet" debuted at number 60 on the U.S. Billboard Hot Country Singles & Tracks for the week of March 13, 1993.

Year-end charts

References

1993 singles
1993 songs
Dwight Yoakam songs
Songs written by Kostas (songwriter)
Songs written by James House (singer)
Reprise Records singles
Song recordings produced by Pete Anderson
Grammy Award for Best Male Country Vocal Performance winners